The 1940–41 Drexel Dragons men's basketball team represented Drexel Institute of Technology during the 1940–41 men's basketball season. The Dragons, led by 2nd year head coach Lawrence Mains, played their home games at Curtis Hall Gym.

Roster

Schedule

|-
!colspan=9 style="background:#F8B800; color:#002663;"| Regular season
|-

Letterwinners
Curtiss Deardorff, James Frank, Jack Styers

References

Drexel Dragons men's basketball seasons
Drexel
1940 in sports in Pennsylvania
1941 in sports in Pennsylvania